William J. Juneau (February 24, 1879 – October 9, 1949) was an American football player and coach of football, basketball, and baseball. He served as the head football coach at Colorado College (1904), South Dakota State College of Agricultural and Mechanic Arts (1906–1907), Marquette University (1908–1911), the University of Wisconsin–Madison (1912–1915), the University of Texas at Austin (1917–1919), and the University of Kentucky (1920–1922), compiling a career college football record of 86–39–10. Juneau was also the head basketball coach at South Dakota State for two seasons from 1905 to 1907, tallying a mark of 7–5. He coached baseball at South Dakota State in 1906 and 1908 and at Wisconsin in 1913, amassing a career college baseball record of 15–12–1.

Biography
Juneau was the grandnephew of Solomon Juneau (1793–1856), a fur trader, land speculator, and politician who helped found the city of Milwaukee, Wisconsin. Juneau played football at Wisconsin as an end and halfback from 1899 to 1902 and captained the Wisconsin Badgers football team in 1902. He began his coaching career in 1903 at Fort Atkinson High School in Fort Atkinson, Wisconsin. Juneau retired from coaching 1923 and entered the real estate business.

He died on October 9, 1949 at the age of 70 in Milwaukee, Wisconsin.

Head coaching record

College football

References

1879 births
1949 deaths
19th-century players of American football
American football drop kickers
American football ends
American football halfbacks
American men's basketball coaches
Baseball coaches from Wisconsin
Basketball coaches from Wisconsin
Coaches of American football from Wisconsin
Colorado College Tigers football coaches
High school football coaches in Wisconsin
Kentucky Wildcats football coaches
Marquette Golden Avalanche football coaches
Players of American football from Milwaukee
South Dakota State Jackrabbits baseball coaches
South Dakota State Jackrabbits football coaches
South Dakota State Jackrabbits men's basketball coaches
Sportspeople from Milwaukee
Texas Longhorns football coaches
Wisconsin Badgers baseball coaches
Wisconsin Badgers football coaches
Wisconsin Badgers football players
American people of French-Canadian descent
William